The Decline ("Until the Decline") is a 2020 Canadian action thriller, directed by Patrice Laliberté in his feature debut and released in 2020. The first Quebec film to be produced as a Netflix original film, the film stars Guillaume Laurin as Antoine, a man from Montreal who joins a survivalist training program in rural Nord-du-Québec led by an experienced middle-aged survivalist, Alain (Réal Bossé), after becoming convinced that a natural disaster is imminent. While the participants at first bond with the seemingly charismatic and paternal Alain, after an accidental training death, the attendees are bitterly divided, triggering a tense showdown.

The film's cast also includes Marc-André Grondin, Isabelle Giroux, Marilyn Castonguay, Marc Beaupré, Marie-Évelyne Lessard and Guillaume Cyr.

The film had its theatrical premiere at the Rendez-vous Québec Cinéma in February 2020, with its premiere on Netflix slated for later in the year. It was later made available as an original on Netflix, with dubbed audio tracks in 32 languages; for the English version (directed by John DeMita), all of the original cast dubbed their own dialogue to ensure that the English accent of Francophone Québécois would be accurately represented.

Plot
A young man named Antoine, his female partner, and their young daughter are practicing an emergency evacuation of their home, grabbing a "bug-out bag" of equipment and timing their effort. The next day, the family watches a survivalist training video on food preservation made by Alain, a charismatic, middle-aged survival enthusiast. After getting an invitation to visit Alain's cabin for a multi-day training session, Antoine drives out alone through a snowy landscape to the isolated camp, where he meets Alain. Alain has built a self-sufficient camp, with a cabin, greenhouse, chicken coops, a generator, solar panels, and batteries. Other survivalism enthusiasts arrive at the camp, including Rachel (a former soldier), Sebastien (a hunting enthusiast), Anna, Francois, and David, a paramilitary type.

Alain trains the students in handgun and rifle drills, snaring and field dressing small animals, and planting in the greenhouse. The students eat in Alain's cabin and sleep in a large tent. During the evening meal, Alain tells the students about his survivalist philosophies. He tells them that despite the general view that survivalists are extremists, he thinks the students are all excellent examples of what a "lucid citizen" should be. He says that if society collapses, he can live in his camp and supply his own needs, and he invites Antoine to think about establishing a home in the camp in the future. The students then learn how to build pipe bombs. Alain tells them that in the event of social collapse if a large number of "migrants with machetes" try to come to the camp, rifles alone might not be a sufficient defence. After testing a bomb, the students pack up the equipment. Francois is tasked with carrying a crate of bombs back to camp, it accidentally explodes, killing him.

Most of the students want to call the police and report the accident, but Alain and David refuse, saying they will all be charged with domestic terrorism or manslaughter, and Alain will lose his survival camp. Alain adjourns the meeting and suggests they decide what to do in the morning. The students agree and go to bed. From inside the tent, the students notice a sudden bright light. They step out to investigate. They see Alain burning Francois's body with gasoline. After protesting, most of the students try to leave the camp using Alain's snowmobile, but Alain shoots Anna in the leg. He and David carry her into the cabin where Alain tourniquets her wound and ties her up. The remaining students run into the woods. Sebastien is soon killed in a noose snare-trap. Antoine and Rachel escape into the bush, where they find a backup "bug-out" cache of arms and food prepared by Alain. The next day, the pair manage to get back to Antoine's car, but David ambushes them with an assault rifle, and Antoine is killed. Rachel has a shoot-out with David, and eventually kills him with blows from the butt of a pistol. She returns to the cabin, where she discovers that Anna has died from her wounds. Rachel sets fire to the greenhouse and takes the assault rifle to the upper floor to watch for Alain.

When Alain arrives at the parking area on his snowmobile, he finds the dead bodies at the parking area and he returns to his cabin.  When Alain draws near, Rachel fires at him, pinning him down, but he uses smoke grenades to hide his movement and gets to the cabin. She disarms him when he enters her room, and they have a brutal hand-to-hand fight. Finally, even though she is injured, she incapacitates him. In the final scene, as Alain's previous speech about survivalism is heard in the background, Rachel loads the wounded Alain onto a sled attached to the snowmobile and drives out of the camp.

Awards and nominations

References

External links
 
 
 

2020 films
2020 action thriller films
Canadian action thriller films
2020s French-language films
Films set in Quebec
French-language Netflix original films
Films shot in Quebec
Films directed by Patrice Laliberté
French-language Canadian films
2020s Canadian films